The Battle of Cape Spartel (Cabo Espartel in Spanish) was a naval battle of the Spanish Civil War that broke the Republican blockade of the Strait of Gibraltar, securing the maritime supply route to Spanish Morocco for the Nationalists early in the war. The action occurred on 29 September 1936 between two Nationalist cruisers and two Republican destroyers.

Background

The rebels at Ferrol, Galicia, had been able to seize the city's naval base in July, but at a large cost: over 30 mutinous officers had been shot by hundreds of sailors loyal to the Republic.

In September, a small squadron, including Almirante Cervera and Canarias, steamed from Ferrol to engage the Republican navy.

At the start of the war, the Spanish Republican Navy had the battleship , three light cruisers, 14 destroyers, plus five submarines. In addition to España, the two cruisers and one destroyer taken by the Nationalists, by the following year they had completed Baleares and Canarias. They also had purchased four destroyers and two submarines from Fascist Italy. The Nationalists established a blockade of the Republican-held coastline for the entire duration of the war, but their paucity of ships limited the blockade's effectiveness.

The battle

The Nationalists engaged a squadron of Republican destroyers stationed on the western end of the Straits shortly after 6:30 am. The destroyer Gravina was deployed near Cape Spartel, while her sister ship  was patrolling off Ceuta. A fierce exchange of fire followed, during which the destroyer Almirante Ferrándiz was chased and eventually sunk by Canarias in the Alboran Sea after a 40-minute engagement, while Gravina was pursued and hit twice by Almirante Cervera along the Atlantic coast of Morocco. The surviving Republican destroyer retreated toward Casablanca. Thirty-one seamen from Almirante Ferrándiz were rescued by Canarias, while the French liner Koutubia picked up another 26, including her commander, José Luis Barbastro Jiménez. This action was decisive to open the Straits to the insurgents' shipping.

See also
List of classes of Spanish Nationalist ships of the Spanish Civil War
Spanish Civil War Republican ship classe
Convoy de la victoria

Notes

References

 Thomas, Hugh (1979). La guerra civil española. Volume 6. Ediciones Urbión, p. 184. . 
 Cortada, James: Historical Dictionary of the Spanish Civil War, 1936-1939. Greenwood Press, 1982.

External links
Summary of Major Campaigns and Offensives

1936 in Spain
Cape Spartel
Maritime incidents in 1936
History of Tangier
Cape Spartel
Cape Spartel
September 1936 events
1936 in Morocco